One Sentence Is Ten Thousand Sentences is a novel written by Liu Zhenyun from 2006 to 2008. It was awarded the Mao Dun Literature Prize in 2011.

The novel has been adapted into a 2016 film Someone to Talk To, directed by Liu Zhenyun's daughter Liu Yulin.

References

2009 Chinese novels
Chinese novels adapted into films
Mao Dun Literature Prize
Novels set in Shanxi
Novels set in Henan
Novels set in Shandong
Novels set in Hebei